Content in this edit is translated from the existing German Wikipedia article at :de:Edmund Schneider (Konstrukteur)

Edmund Schneider (26 July 1901 - 5 July 1968 was a German aircraft designer and owner of a glider factory.

Career

Early life
Schnieder was born in Ravensburg on 26 July 1902. After completing an apprenticeship as a carpenter in Memmingen, he applied to the air force towards the end of the First World War he was found unfit to fly, but found employment as a carpenter in the Schleissheim aircraft hangar, where military aircraft were repaired and he was able to study the fighter aircraft designs of Pfalz Albatros Flugzeugwerke, LFG, Fokker and Junkers .

Bavaria
At end of the war he to the Wasserkuppe mountain gliding site in the spring of 1923.. He met Gottlob Espenlaub  and helped him with the completion of gliders he designed with Alexander Lippischa for the Rhön competition in the summer of 1923.

Grunau 
In autumn 1923 he went together with Espenlaub at the invitation of a local group of the German Flying club  to Grunau near Hirschberg Silesia (now Poland). In the winter in Grunau, the construction of an easy-to-build and easy-to-fly, stable training glider was developed, which after a few modifications finally led to the Espenlaub-Schneider ESG-9 - a basic training glider. While Espenlaub later went to Kassel, Schneider settled down in Grunau and started his own business in 1928 with the Segelflugzeugbau Edmund Schneider. His most famous construction, the Schneider Grunau Baby. By about1931 some 3000 examples had been produced by his company in  Grunau. 

In addition to the company's own aircraft, the gliders Wiesenbaude 1 and Wiesenbaude 2 were also commissioned for Eugen Bönsch, and the fuselage of the Moazagotl by Schneider ESG 31 Schlesierland for Eugen Bönsch who during 1931 – 2 was  principal of the Grunau gliding school.

World War II
Due to the increasing demand from the National Socialist Flyers Corps, Schneider employed more than 350 people in two plants when war broke out in 1939. At the end of World War II, Schneider left his business and fled with his family to Mühlhofen on Lake Constance.

Australia
The result was the draft ES-49, design, of which a copy has been preserved on the Wasserkuppe. The Schneider family emigrated to Australia in 1951 at the invitation of the Adelaide Aero Club in which city he established the Edmund Schneider Pty Ltd. Other well-known gliders such as the Schneider ES-52 Kookaburra and the Schneider ES-60 Boomerang were built in Australia at Schneider's new factory in Adelaide. A licensed version of the Schleicher Ka 6 was also built in Australia.

Death
Schneider died on 5 July 1968 in Rottach-Egern in Germany aged 67.

References

1901 births
1968 deaths
German aerospace engineers